The Margalla Hills are a hill range within the Margalla Hills National Park on the northern edge of Islamabad Capital Territory, Pakistan, just south of Haripur District, Khyber Pakhtunkhwa. They are part of the Himalayan foothills. The Margalla range has an area of 12,605 hectares. It is a range with many valleys as well as high mountains.

Infrastructure

Khayaban-e-Iqbal, arises on the north east side from the 4th Avenue (Nur Pur Shahan), runs between E and F sectors, and ends at Service Road West of F-11 and E-11 (Golra) sectors in the south-east. It will be extended up to Grand Trunk (GT) Road in the near future.

Paleontology and archeology 
According to the research carried out by scientists and archaeologists of the project "Post-Earthquake Explorations of Human Remains in Margalla Hills", the formation of the Margalla Hills dates to the Miocene epoch. The dominant limestone of the Margalla is mixed with sandstone and occasional minor beds of shale. The archaeologists of the project have also found two human footprints over one million years old here, preserved in sandstone.

Flora and fauna 

There are around 250 to 300 species of plants on the Margalla Hills. As many as two-thirds of them are used by the people for their medicinal effects to treat or cure various diseases.

The Margalla Hills are home to various species of wildlife, including monkeys, exotic birds and carnivores such as the rare and presently endangered Margalla leopard.

Much less common are leopards, which occasionally come down from the Murree area but usually remain high up in the hills. Villagers dwelling in the Margallas do report sighting of leopards off and on.

Recreation

Bird watching 

The Margallas are an excellent place for bird watchers. The area is home to a large number of birds, including robins, sparrows, kites, crows, larks, paradise flycatchers, black partridge, shrikes, pheasants, spotted doves, Egyptian vultures, falcons, hawks, eagles, Himalayan griffon vulture, laggar falcon, peregrine falcon, kestrel, Indian sparrow hawk, white cheeked bulbul, yellow vented bulbul, paradise flycatcher, cheer pheasant, Khalij pheasant, golden oriole, spotted dove, collared dove, wheatears and buntings.

The cheer pheasant, indigenous to the Khyber Pakhtunkhwa, was being reared in Margalla Hills as a part of conservation campaign by the World Pheasant Association and Capital Development Authority.

Hiking trails 
There are several hiking trails in the Margalla Hills. Trail 3 and 5 are the most popular ones, starting from the Margalla Road opposite sector F-6 and ending at the Pir Sohawa Road.

Environmental conservation 

The ecology of Margallas faces threats from quarrying by stone-crushing plants, deforestation, illegal encroachments, and buildings, and poachers. Crush plants situated around the hills near Taxila are busy eroding the hills for extracting building material. Deforestation is resulting from fires and illegal felling of trees.

Margalla Hills Society
The Margalla Hills Society was established in 1989.

World Wildlife Fund (WWF) Pakistan
The WWF-Pakistan's 'Green School Programme', in collaboration with the Capital Development Authority (CDA), carries out 'Eco-Adventure Activities' on the Margalla hills to raise awareness in the school children regarding  the conservation of natural environment and about the importance of being environmentally responsible.

Events
 On 28 July 2010, Airblue Flight 202 crashed in the Margalla Hills.
 On 6 January 2012, snowfall over Margalla Hills.
 On 11 February 2016, snowfall over Margalla Hills.

Places in Margalla Hills 
Daman-e-Koh
Pir Sohawa
Shahdara, Islamabad

See also 
Margalla Hills National Park
Birds of Islamabad
Airblue Flight 202
Faisal Mosque

References

Hill stations in Pakistan
Hills of Pakistan
Landforms of Islamabad
Climbing areas of Pakistan
Mountain ranges of the Himalayas
Himalayan subtropical broadleaf forests